"Ruby Ann" is a song written by Lee Emerson, Rashima Bellamy and Roberta Bellamy, and recorded by American country music artist Marty Robbins. It was released in October 1962.  "Ruby Ann" was the number one country follow-up to "Devil Woman." "Ruby Ann" spent a single week at number one and crossed over to the pop chart peaking at number eighteen. On the Easy Listening chart "Ruby Ann" went to number four.

Chart performance

References

Marty Robbins songs
1962 singles
Columbia Records singles
1962 songs